John James McJennett (1906 — after 1933) was a Welsh professional footballer who played as a full back. He made five appearances in the Football League for Cardiff City.

References

1906 births
Date of death missing
Welsh footballers
Footballers from Cardiff
Cardiff City F.C. players
Exeter City F.C. players
English Football League players
Association football fullbacks